Tyler Birch (born 30 December 1995) is a New Zealand rugby league footballer who plays as a  for the Brisbane Broncos in the NRL Women's Premiership and Burleigh Bears in the QRL Women's Premiership.

Background
Born in Wellington, Birch played rugby union before moving to Australia. In Australia, she play rugby sevens for the University of Adelaide and Bond University.

Playing career
On 15 February 2019, she started on the wing and scored a try for the Māori All Stars in their 8–4 win over the Indigenous All Stars.

In May 2019, she represented South East Queensland at the Women's National Championships.

2020
On 28 September, Birch joined the Brisbane Broncos NRL Women's Premiership team. In Round 1 of the 2020 NRL Women's season, Birch made her debut for the Broncos, coming off the bench in a 28–14 win over the New Zealand Warriors.

References

External links
Brisbane Broncos profile

1995 births
Living people
New Zealand Māori rugby league players
New Zealand female rugby league players
Rugby league wingers
Rugby league centres
Brisbane Broncos (NRLW) players